Metepilysta is a genus of beetles in the family Cerambycidae, containing the following species:

 Metepilysta enganensis Breuning, 1970
 Metepilysta negrosensis Breuning, 1970

References

Apomecynini